, provisional designation , is a dark Zhongguo asteroid from the background population in the outermost region of the asteroid belt, approximately  in diameter. It was discovered on 24 January 1998, by astronomers with the Lincoln Near-Earth Asteroid Research at the Lincoln Laboratory's Experimental Test Site near Socorro, New Mexico, in the United States.

Orbit and classification 

 is a non-family asteroid from the main belt's background population, and a member of the small group of Zhongguo asteroids, located in the Hecuba gap and locked in a 2:1 mean-motion resonance with the gas giant Jupiter. Contrary to the nearby Griqua group, the orbits of the Zhongguos are stable over half a billion years. According to Milani and Knežević, this asteroid is a core member of the unnamed asteroid family formed by the Zhongguo asteroid .

It orbits the Sun in the outer main-belt at a distance of 2.7–3.9 AU once every 6.02 years (2,199 days; semi-major axis of 3.31 AU). Its orbit has an eccentricity of 0.19 and an inclination of 1° with respect to the ecliptic.

The body's observation arc begins with a precovery taken by Spacewatch in November 1996, or 14 months prior to its official discovery observation at Socorro.

Physical characteristics 

 has an absolute magnitude of 13.5. As of 2018, no rotational lightcurve for this asteroid has been obtained from photometric observations. The body's rotation period, pole and shape remain unknown.

Diameter and albedo 

According to the survey carried out by the NEOWISE mission of NASA's Wide-field Infrared Survey Explorer,  measures 9.827 kilometers in diameter and its surface has an albedo of 0.061, which is rather typical for the abundant carbonaceous C-type asteroids in the outer main-belt.

Numbering and naming 

This minor planet was numbered by the Minor Planet Center on 13 September 2000, after its orbit had sufficiently been secured. As of 2018, it has not been named.

References

External links 
 Asteroid Lightcurve Database (LCDB), query form (info )
 Discovery Circumstances: Numbered Minor Planets (15001)-(20000) – Minor Planet Center
 
 

016882
016882
016882
19980124